Nathan Dekoke (born 6 January 1996) is a French footballer who plays as a defender for  club FBBP01.

Club career
Dekoke is a youth exponent from Saint-Étienne. He made his first team debut on 16 December 2015 against Paris Saint-Germain playing the full Coupe de la Ligue match.

On 27 July 2016, he signed a three-year contract with Amiens. He made just one Ligue 2 appearance and one Coupe de la Ligue appearance in the 2016–17 season, and by October 2017 had not made any appearances for the senior team in the 2017–18 season. He joined US Boulogne on loan until the end of the season on 20 October 2017. He was loaned out again, for the 2018–19 season, to US Avranches.

Having been released by Amiens, Dekoke signed for AS Lyon-Duchère in January 2020. The club was rebranded Sporting Club Lyon in June 2020.

On 15 July 2022, Dekoke signed with FBBP01.

Personal life
Born in France, Dekoke is of DR Congolese descent.

References

External links
 

1996 births
Living people
French sportspeople of Democratic Republic of the Congo descent
Sportspeople from Aubervilliers
French footballers
Association football defenders
AS Saint-Étienne players
Amiens SC players
US Boulogne players
US Avranches players
Lyon La Duchère players
US Quevilly-Rouen Métropole players
Football Bourg-en-Bresse Péronnas 01 players
Ligue 1 players
Ligue 2 players
Championnat National players
Championnat National 2 players
Championnat National 3 players
Footballers from Seine-Saint-Denis
Black French sportspeople